Gamasellus virguncula is a species of mite in the family Ologamasidae.

This species was formerly a member of the genus Onchogamasus.

References

Ologamasidae
Articles created by Qbugbot
Animals described in 1973